Tuxedo Park is a village in Orange County, New York, United States. Its population was 645 at the 2020 census. It is part of the Poughkeepsie–Newburgh–Middletown metropolitan area as well as the larger New York metropolitan area.

Tuxedo Park is a gated village in the southern part of the town of Tuxedo, near New York Route 17 and the New York State Thruway.

The evening dress for men now popularly known in the North America as a tuxedo takes its name from Tuxedo Park. It was brought there by James Brown Potter, who was introduced to the garment by the Prince of Wales (later Edward VII).

History
The park is in the Ramapo Mountains. In the colonial era, it acquired a reputation for undeveloped iron deposits. In consequence, a company formed in England and headed by William Alexander, Lord Stirling, acquired a large tract in the neighborhood. The company built furnaces near Ringwood and opened mines on the Ramapo River near Sterling Lake. Pierre Lorillard II acquired the company and its land holdings in 1790. Once the iron deposits were depleted, the land was used for lumbering.

What is now the village and the areas immediately surrounding it were first developed as a private hunting-and-fishing reserve by Pierre Lorillard IV in 1885. At that time it became known as "Tuxedo Park". Lorillard IV initially built small cottages, renting or selling them to his friends and family. The project grew so popular that he organized the Tuxedo Club and the Tuxedo Park Association, and surrounded the property with a high game fence. This fence fairly accurately marked the present boundaries of the area restricted to use of the residents of Tuxedo Park. In 1924 the Tuxedo Securities Corporation acquired from the Estate of Peter Lorillard, deceased, all of the stock of the Tuxedo Park Association.

The original clubhouse, designed by Bruce Price, was built in 1886 and was then replaced by a second clubhouse in 1928, which was designed by John Russell Pope. This building was destroyed by fire in 1943, and was partially rebuilt soon thereafter.

The shingle style cottages Price built at Tuxedo, with their compact massing and axial plans influenced Modernist architects, including Frank Lloyd Wright. Queen Anne architecture with Tudor elements became popular for residences.

Tuxedo Park enjoyed many prosperous years from 1885 until the 1920s. The Blue Book of Etiquette was written by Emily Post, who was the daughter of Bruce Price. She wrote the book based on what she observed inside the great stone gates of Tuxedo. Other Tuxedo notables from that era include:
 Grenville Kane – banker, heir, and longtime resident
 Dorothy Draper – interior designer
 Adele Colgate – heir to the Colgate/Palmolive fortune
 Fernando Yznaga – banker; brother of Consuelo Yznaga, Duchess of Manchester
 George Fisher Baker – banker
 J. P. Morgan – banker
 Alfred Lee Loomis – investment banker, scientist
 William Waldorf Astor
 Herbert C. Pell
 Augustus Juilliard
 Millicent Rogers
 James Whitmore

During the 1920s a new hospital and a high school were built through the generosity of a few Tuxedo Park residents, including John Insley Blair. In the years following the Great Depression, however, Tuxedo Park lost many of its socialites and wealthy inhabitants, but attracted a few new ones, as well. One of the new residences was built by Angier Biddle Duke, (cousin to Doris Duke), whose father-in-law, George Baker St. George, was an original resident of Tuxedo. St. George purchased and built for Duke and his wife, Priscilla St George, a new estate, "Duck Hollow". Duck Hollow was the last built estate in Tuxedo Park by the old "blue blood elite". While Duke and his wife were traveling abroad, as most elites did at that time, St. George had landscape architect Arthur P. Kroll landscape the property. By the time the Dukes returned from Europe, the property had been transformed and appeared to have been there for over 100 years.

The area known as Tuxedo Park separated from the Town of Tuxedo and became incorporated in 1952, adopting the village form of government.  Today it includes , of which  includes three lakes, and about 330 housing units in 340 structures. Other newer housing developments outside of the gated Village of Tuxedo Park but in the Town of Tuxedo include the Tuxedo Heights Condominiums in Southfields built in 1971 on the site of a former bed factory, the Mountain View Apartments near the Sloatsburg line, and The Woodlands at Tuxedo (townhomes HOA) in the Eagle Valley section. The former private mansion residence of Loomis of Alfred Lee Loomis is sometimes referred to as the Loomis Laboratory,  and it is now private rental apartments inside the Village of Tuxedo Park.  

Outside of the gated Village of Tuxedo Park, in the Town of Tuxedo were the former Red Apple Rest, and the Sterling Forest Ski Center, aka Tuxedo Ridge Ski Resort.  This former ski property is home to the New York Renaissance Festival and various sporting events including Spartan Races.  Also in the Town of Tuxedo is a former International Paper Research Center today owned and occupied by Watchtower Organization. Just outside the gates of Tuxedo Park is the Hamlet of The Town of Tuxedo, which consists of numerous historic structures built around the time of the original Tuxedo Park development. Historic buildings include the Tuxedo Train station (Metro-North stop Tuxedo), the Tuxedo Park Library (designed by Bruce Price), and the Tuxedo Park Post Office and Our Lady of Mt. Carmel Catholic Church.

In recognition of its historical and architectural significance, the historic district was listed as Tuxedo Park on the National Register of Historic Places on March 13, 1980. In 1982 the designation was officially presented to Mrs. Joan Richardsson Alleman, Co-Chairman of the Tuxedo Conservation and Taxpayers Association, at the Washington's Headquarters State Historic Site in nearby Newburgh, NY. The designation was presented by Oren Lehman, Commissioner of Parks, Recreation, and Historic Preservation and is displayed at the Tuxedo Park Village Office.

Geography
Tuxedo Park is at  (41.201461, -74.201668).

The village is in Orange County near its border with Rockland County, in the Ramapo Mountains.

The New York State Thruway (Interstate 87) and New York State Route 17 pass east of the village, which is north of Sloatsburg.

Sterling Forest State Park is west of the village, and Harriman State Park is to the east.

Within the confines of the village are three lakes: Tuxedo Lake is the largest by far of the three and serves as the village reservoir, while the smaller Weewah Lake and Pond #2 serve as purely recreational bodies of water. No swimming or power-boating is allowed in Tuxedo Lake in order to retain optimal water quality.

Demographics

As of the census of 2000, there were 731 people, 291 households, and 215 families residing in the village. The population density was 272.9 people per square mile (105.3/km2). There were 363 housing units at an average density of 135.5 per square mile (52.3/km2). The racial makeup of the village was 94.4% white, 0.7% African American, 0.1% Native American, 2.2% Asian, 0.3% from other races, and 2.3% from two or more races. Hispanic or Latino of any race were 5.1% of the population.

There were 291 households, out of which 29.6% had children under the age of 18 living with them, 63.9% were married couples living together, 8.9% had a female householder with no husband present, and 26.1% were non-families. 21.6% of all households were made up of individuals, and 7.9% had someone living alone who was 65 years of age or older. The average household size was 2.51 and the average family size was 2.88.

In the village, the age distribution of the population shows 22.2% under the age of 18, 5.1% from 18 to 24, 23.3% from 25 to 44, 37.3% from 45 to 64, and 12.2% who were 65 years of age or older. The median age was 45 years. For every 100 females, there were 98.1 males. For every 100 females age 18 and over, there were 94.9 males.

The median income for a household in the village was $91,820, and the median income for a family was $102,056. Males had a median income of $70,536 versus $46,250 for females. The per capita income for the village was $63,538. About 1.9% of families and 4.4% of the population were below the poverty line, including 2.7% of those under age 18 and none of those age 65 or over.

Notable people

• Zita of Bourbon-Parma (Zita Maria delle Grazie Adelgonda Micaela Raffaela Gabriella Giuseppina Antonia Luisa Agnese; 9 May 1892 – 14 March 1989) was the wife of Charles, the last monarch of Austria-Hungary. As such, she was the last Empress of Austria and Queen of Hungary.
 Albert Einstein, theoretical physicist
 Dorothy Draper, American designer, interior decorator
 Thibaut de Saint Phalle, American investment banker, former director of the Export–Import Bank of the United States
 Sutton Foster, actress, dancer, and singer
 Fred Gwynne, actor
 Alfred Lee Loomis, attorney, investment banker, scientist, physicist, inventor of the LORAN, funded RADAR development before the government funded it
 Charles Edwin Mitchell (October 6, 1877 – December 14, 1955), an American banker whose incautious securities policies facilitated the speculation which led to the Crash of 1929
 Ambrose Monell, American industrialist, former president of International Nickel Company and namesake of the Monel alloy 
 Howard Shore, composer
 Katharine St. George, former US Congressman
 John F. (Jack) White, president of National Educational Television and the Cooper Union for the Advancement of Science and Art
 Katherine Rosman, a reporter for the New York Times
 Gary Parr, investment banker
 Henry Varnum Poor, founder of Standard & Poor’s
 Guy Spier, hedge fund manager

Notable locations 

 Jehovah's Witnesses World Headquarters
 I.B.M. Sterling Forest

See also

Tuxedo Park School
Tuxedo, New York

References

Further reading
 Rushmore, George M., The world with a fence around it : Tuxedo Park, the early days, New York : Pageant Press, 1957.
 Winslow, Albert Foster, Tuxedo Park : a journal of recollections, Tuxedo Park, N.Y. : Tuxedo Historical Society, 1992. 
 Tuxedo Park: The Historic Houses By Sonne, Christian R.; Hempel, Chiu Yin, (editors); James Bleecker (photographer),

External links

 Tuxedo Park Fire Department
 Village of Tuxedo Park
 Tuxedo Historical Society
 Tuxedo Park FYI
 Tuxedo Park Fine Homes

Villages in New York (state)
Villages in Orange County, New York
Ramapos
Historic districts on the National Register of Historic Places in New York (state)
Populated places established in 1886
Queen Anne architecture in New York (state)
Italianate architecture in New York (state)
Poughkeepsie–Newburgh–Middletown metropolitan area
National Register of Historic Places in Orange County, New York